Charvet Place Vendôme or simply Charvet is a French high-end bespoke and ready-to-wear shirtmaker, located at 28 Place Vendôme in Paris.
Its list of customers is notable for its time span, Charvet existing since 1838 and having been the first shirt store ever, and as a paradigm of an international "aristo-dandy crossover community". In the 19th century, the shirtmaker both specialized in "royal haberdashery" and attracted the patronage of artists.  In the 20th century, with the development of fashion design, designers and fashion journalists became a significant customer group. Some other customers' interest in the brand has become a notable aspect of their personality. In keeping with a tradition of discretion of French couture houses, the company declines to comment on its customers list, as a service to its customers.

Kings, princes, heads of state and heads of government

Writers, artists and actors

Designers and fashion specialists

Other clients with a notable interest in Charvet

Notes

Sources

External links 

Paris-related lists
Lists of people by activity
Charvet Place Vendome Customers
Charvet Place Vendome Customers
Charvet Place Vendome Customers
Charvet Place Vendome Customers
Charvet Place Vendome Customers
Charvet Place Vendome Customers